Windmill Tump, also known as Rodmarton Chambered Tomb, is a Neolithic burial site, a stone tumulus or barrow. It is a mound covering the site of graves, in the form of a cairn, located in Gloucestershire. It lies to the west of the village of Rodmarton, south of the road between Cherington and Tarlton. There are trees growing on the site.

Description
The construction consists of approximately 5,000 tons of stone, under a mound. The only portion of the stones that can still be seen is a fake entrance, which lies at the eastern side of the mound.

The site is managed by Gloucestershire County Council, under the guardianship of English Heritage.

Excavations
Digging took place in 1863, and again in 1939, after which the mound was restored.

The site contains two tombs, behind the false entrance, with passageways to the north and south. The tombs contained the remains of ten adults and three children. Animal remains were also uncovered, including boar tusks, horses teeth and calf jawbones.

It was noted at the time that this specific arrangement was similar to cromlech mounds in Kilkenny, Ireland, and in Cornwall. The third stone may have been placed in this manner for use in sacrifices.

Evidence of structured walls to support the cairn were also discovered. with a double-thickness wall surrounding the entire structure, and further walls providing strength in a transverse direction.

Etymology
There is no evidence that a windmill ever existed in the location; instead, one possible etymology derives from the word Nant from Nantoush, meaning "The diffuser of fire or light", and the English word win which has similar meaning.

References

External links

  Page at English Heritage
  Details of excavations and references: English Heritage

History of Gloucestershire
Barrows in England
English Heritage sites in Gloucestershire